Belleoram is a village on the shores of Fortune Bay in the Canadian province of Newfoundland and Labrador.

The community sits on a narrow strip of land hemmed in between the bay and steep hills that rise behind it. Belleoram has a large harbour and shelter from the sea, with the protection of a natural breakwater.

History 
Belleoram, a fishing community, had a fish plant which closed in 1989. Aquaculture and fish farming are important economic drivers.

Belleoram dates back to 1774. The French used the area and called it "Bande de Laurier." By 1713, the Treaty of Utrecht had forced the French to leave. In 1718, Captain Tavenor sailed around the south of Newfoundland and called it "Belorme's Place." In the 17th century, a French adventurer wintered there for 20 years, and he was the first to name the community Belleoram.

A Dorchester man named Parsons, is said to be the first English settler in Belleoram, followed by another Dorchester man named John Cluett. Other people came from the west of England as servants to the early planters.

Demographics 

Attractions 
The Anglican Church in Belleoram, locally known as the "Cathedral of the South Coast" was built in 1891 and consecrated as St. Lawrence Church in 1901. The Church is representative of Gothic architecture, a style of architecture developed in Western Europe between the 12th and 16th centuries.

Visitors can see the John Cluett Heritage House which was built about 1844 and is best described as a "saltbox," one of the simplest forms of architecture and common amongst early settlers. The Cluett House, which is over 150 years old, is constructed mainly of original timber.  Also, they can attend the Ironskull Folk Festival, which is an annual event held the third weekend of July every year. The festival showcases the area's musical talent and is a collaboration among many Newfoundland artists. The Ironskull Festival takes its name from the mountain located across the harbour. A trail provides visitors with the opportunity to hike to the summit and view the surrounding coastline.

See also
 Frances Cluett
 Newfoundland outport
 Simani

References

 

Populated coastal places in Canada
Towns in Newfoundland and Labrador
Fishing communities in Canada